Paul Soloway (October 10, 1941 – November 5, 2007) was a world champion American bridge player. He won the Bermuda Bowl world team championship five times and won 30 North American Bridge Championships "national"-level events. 

Soloway was inducted into the ACBL Hall of Fame in 2002. At the time of his death he held 65,511.92 masterpoints – more than any other player in history, and more than 6000 points ahead of second place.

Early life
Born and raised in Los Angeles, California, Soloway nearly drowned at age three when he fell into a swimming pool at the home of family friend George Raft. He was saved by his uncle, gangster Bugsy Siegel, who jumped into the pool and pulled him out.

Soloway learned to play bridge in college, where he majored in business studies. He first played duplicate bridge in 1962. Shortly after graduation, he became a bridge professional. In 1971, he joined the Dallas Aces bridge team, but left after one year. In 1998 he joined the Nick Nickell team. He lived in Mill Creek, Washington, and died at a hospital in Seattle, Washington, from a heart attack during his treatment for Staphylococcus aureus. He was cremated with a deck of bridge cards in his hand.

Bridge accomplishments

Honors
 ACBL Hall of Fame, 2002
 Lazard Sportsmanship Award 2001

Awards
 ACBL Player of the Year 1998
 Barry Crane Top 500 1998
 McKenney Trophy 1968, 1969
 Mott-Smith Trophy 2002
 Fishbein Trophy 1998
 Herman Trophy 1976

Wins
 Bermuda Bowl (5) 1976, 1977, 1979, 2000, 2003
 North American Bridge Championships (30)
 Vanderbilt (6) 1969, 1978, 1997, 1998, 2000, 2003
 Spingold (9) 1978, 1983, 1986, 1988, 1998, 1999, 2004, 2006, 2007
 Reisinger (4) 1976, 1980, 2004, 2005
 Grand National Teams (2) 1974, 1976
 Open Board-a-Match Teams (1) 1993
 Jacoby Open Swiss Teams (3) 1991, 2002, 2006
 North American Men's Swiss Teams (1) 1989
 Master Mixed Teams (2) 1966, 1987
 Life Master Open Pairs (1) 1999
 Life Master Men's Pairs (1) 1965
 United States Bridge Championships (13)
  Open Team Trials (13) 1972, 1974, 1975, 1977, 1979 (Jan), 1979 (Dec), 1984, 1995, 1998, 2001, 2002, 2004, 2007
 Other notable wins:
 Buffett Cup (1) 2006
 Cavendish Invitational Pairs (1) 1995

Runners-up
 Bermuda Bowl (2) 1975, 2005
 World Open Team Olympiad (2) 1972, 1980
 North American Bridge Championships (18)
 Vanderbilt (3) 1971, 1976, 2002
 Spingold (4) 1973, 1990, 1994, 1996
 Reisinger (4) 1986, 1990, 1993, 1994
 Open Board-a-Match Teams (3) 1995, 1998, 1999
 Men's Board-a-Match Teams (2) 1970, 1984
 Jacoby Open Swiss Teams (1) 2005
 Men's Pairs (1) 1969
 United States Bridge Championships (1)
  Open Team Trials(1) 1969
 Other notable 2nd places:
 Cavendish Invitational Teams (5) 1998, 2004, 2005, 2006, 2007
 Sunday Times Invitational Pairs (1) 1990

References

External links
 
 

1941 births
2007 deaths
American contract bridge players
Bermuda Bowl players
People from Los Angeles
People from Seattle